The Legend of King Naresuan: The Series - Reclaiming Sovereignty is second season of the MONO29 Thai Historical action series The Legend of King Naresuan: The Series premiered on August 1, 2018 on MONOMAXX.COM. The season continues Season 1, The series centers on the "Prince Naresuan" when he reclaiming to sovereignty that is based on the King Naresuan 2 part two in film of the same name

Cast and characters

Main cast
Daweerit Chullasapya as Prince Naresuan 
Pacharawan Vadrukchit as Manechan
Rachan Sharma as Rachamanu (Bunting) - Teenager
Nattarika Faodan as Princess Lerkin
Aungoont Thanasapchroen as Prince Minchit Sra
Raiwin Ratsaminiyomwut as Princess Natshin Medaw
Pacharanamon Nonthapa as Princess Supankulaya
Pattaravadee Laosa as Princess Wilaikalaya
Worachai Hirunlabh as Phra Chaiburi
Athiwat Theeranithitnanth as Phra Srithamorrat

Recurring cast
 Pitchawut Piemtammaroj as Prince Ekathotsarot
 Atiwat Snitwong Na Ayutthaya as  King Maha Thamaracha
 Siraprapha Sukdumrong as Queen Wisutkasat
 Patthamawan Kaomoolkadi as Princess Thep Kasattri
 Marttra Praihirun as King of Kang
 Krilash Kreangkrai as Phraya Dhamma
 Rungtiwa Kongsanun as Keanchan
 NongBew Kawkong as Saming
 Paramej Noi-Am as King Bayinnaung
 Kasab Champadib as King Nanda Bayin
 Nussara Prawanna as Queen Meng Pyu
 Suchao Pongwilai as Surakhamma
 Tanayonng Wongtrakul as Lord Luckwaitummoo
 Yutphichai Chanlekha as Phraya Kiet
 Bhasaworn Bawronkirati as Phraya Ram
 Kunakorn Kirdpan as King Barommaracha IV (Nak Phra Satra)
 Eak Thanakorn as King Thado Minsaw

Episode

References

External links 
 The Legend of King Naresuan: The Series (season 2) all episode
 
 

2018 Thai television seasons